No contest (abbreviated "NC") is a technical term used in some combat sports to describe a fight that ends for reasons outside the fighters' hands, without a winner or loser. The concept carried over to professional wrestling, where it is far more common, usually scripted to further a feud, generate heat and/or protect a push.

Boxing
In the 19th and early parts of the 20th century, many countries (and some parts of the United States) officially banned boxing, and occasionally the police would step in to shut down the bouts (which, although unlawful, were still sanctioned by regional boxing commissions). Since boxing is now lawful virtually anywhere in the world, the number of fights called no contest has decreased dramatically since the beginning of the 20th century. Referees were also known to stop bouts during this period when they felt bouts were too slow due to lack of aggression from one or both boxers.

In the modern game, the various rules that dictate whether a fight should be called a no contest, a disqualification, or a knockout differ between countries and boxing organizations. Rules in the United States now dictate that any bout which ends prior to the completion of the 4th round, due to an accidental headbutt, is to be declared a no contest. Prior to this, accidental headbutt stoppages had been ruled a technical draw. Most other no contests in boxing occur when unusual circumstances, which would include instances such as an outdoor bout being rained out, the ring falling apart, or an unexpected injury caused by something outside of the boxer's control. 

One good example of an unusual circumstance occurred in 1983, on the undercard of the fight where Roberto Durán beat Davey Moore for the World Jr. Middleweight title at the Madison Square Garden, when Luis Resto and Billy Collins Jr boxed ten rounds. Resto appeared to win the fight cleanly, and the scorers gave the match to Resto. But, it was later discovered that he had cheated by tampering with his gloves before the fight. The injuries Collins received affected his sight, and, upon finding out what Resto and his corner had done, the New York State Athletic Commission decided to change the result of the fight to a no contest.

On August 28, 1998, Bernard Hopkins fought Robert Allen in Las Vegas, Nevada, United States. The fight was ruled a no contest when Hopkins was injured after he was accidentally pushed out of the ring by referee Mills Lane as Lane was trying to break up a clinch.

Mixed martial arts
No contest decisions in mixed martial arts (MMA) are usually declared when an accidental illegal strike (the rules on which differ from each organization) causes the recipient of the blow to be unable to continue, that decision being made by the referee, doctor, the fighter or his corner. Each fighter receives a NC counted in their record and is scored as neither a win nor a loss. Blows from intentional illegal strikes that force a fighter to be unable to continue are not declared a no contest, but as a win and a loss by disqualification for the appropriate fighters.

In 2007, a controversial no contest decision in MMA occurred at The Ultimate Fighter 5 season finale between Rob Emerson and Gray Maynard. Maynard knocked himself temporarily unconscious during a takedown of Emerson, who then submitted due to an aggravated injury of the ribs, each being unaware that the other fighter could not continue. While awaiting the official announcement many believed that Gray Maynard would be declared the winner, because Emerson tapped out and it appeared that Maynard was unharmed. The NC decision was made due to both fighters being unable to continue. A replay of the incident, taken from a different angle, later confirmed that Maynard had indeed knocked himself out and needed assistance to stand back up.

At Legends of Fighting Championship 25: Breaking Point in May 2008, Tyler Bryan and Shaun Parker knocked each other out simultaneously with two legal punches. Referee Shonie Carter, surprised and unsure of protocol, ultimately signaled for a no-contest rather than a draw. Both fighters became popular video stars and ended their brief fighting careers later that year.

Team sports

American football

A 2022 game between the Cincinnati Bengals and the Buffalo Bills was officially ruled a no contest after Bills safety Damar Hamlin suffered a sudden cardiac arrest and collapsed on the field. The game was suspended with 5:58 remaining in the first quarter, and was officially ruled a no contest three days later.

References

Boxing rules and regulations